Being Human is a supernatural drama television series developed for North American television by Jeremy Carver and Anna Fricke, based upon the British series of the same name created by Toby Whithouse. The series premiered on Syfy and Space Channel on January 17, 2011, with a thirteen episode first season and tells the story of Aidan (Sam Witwer) and Josh (Sam Huntington), a vampire and a werewolf respectively, who move into a new apartment only to discover that it is haunted by the ghost of a previous tenant, Sally (Meaghan Rath). Together, the three of them discover that being human is not as easy as it seems.

Cast

Main cast
 Sam Witwer as Aidan Waite
 Meaghan Rath as Sally Malik
 Sam Huntington as Josh Levison
 Mark Pellegrino as James Bishop

Recurring cast
 Gianpaolo Venuta as Danny Angeli
 Vincent Leclerc as Marcus Damnian
 Sarah Allen as Rebecca Flynt
 Kristen Hager as Nora Sargeant
 Angela Galuppo as Bridget
 Alison Louder as Emily Levison
 Terry Kinney as Heggeman
 Andreas Apergis as Ray
 Jason Spevack as Bernie
 Nathalie Breuer and Laurence Leboeuf as Celine
 Pat Kiely as Nick Finn
 Ellen David as Ilana Myers

Episodes

References

External links 
 
 

2011 Australian television seasons

2011 Canadian television seasons